Ottorino Respighi composed three pieces often referred to as Sei pezzi:

Sei pezzi per violino e pianoforte for violin and piano
Sei pezzi per pianoforte for piano
Sei pezzi per bambini for piano four hands